Abolition refers to the act of putting an end to something by law, and may refer to:

Abolitionism, abolition of slavery
Abolition of the death penalty, also called capital punishment
Abolition of monarchy
Abolition of nuclear weapons
Abolition of prisons
Police abolition movement
Abolition of suffering
Abolitionism (animal rights), related to veganism
Abolition of time zones
Abolition of borders

See also
 
Abolition of slavery timeline
Abolitionism (disambiguation)